Ross Turnbull (July 4, 1934 – December 8, 2015) was a Canadian retired-American ice hockey wing who played four seasons in the International Hockey League  and Eastern Hockey League.

Biography
Turnbull was born on July 4, 1934, in Barrie, Ontario. He died December 8, 2015.

Playing career
Turnbull began his career with the Fort Wayne Komets of the IHL for the 1954-55 season. In his first and only season with the Komets, Turnbull played 17 games, scored a goal, and passed four assists. He did not play the following season but suited up for the Philadelphia Ramblers of the EHL in 1956-57. It was, statistically, his best year, as he scored 68 points (37 goals, 31 assists) in the regular season. That season, Turnball played the only playoff games of his career, with eight points off of three goals and five assists. The next season, he had 20 goals and 23 assists to combine for 43 points. In his last year for the Ramblers, in 1958-59, Turnball only played 24 games, in which he scored 13 points, with six goals and seven assists.

Statistics

References

1934 births
Canadian ice hockey forwards
2015 deaths
Ice hockey people from Ontario
Sportspeople from Barrie